Morris Branch (historically Morris Run) is a  long 1st order tributary to Corks Point Ditch in New Castle County, Delaware.

Course
Morris Branch rises the Sawmill Branch divide about 0.5 miles west of Walker in New Castle County, Delaware.  Morris Branch then flows southeast then northeast to meet Corks Point Ditch about 1 mile southeast of Walker, Delaware.

Watershed
Morris Branch drains  of area, receives about 44.9 in/year of precipitation, has a topographic wetness index of 556.00 and is about 13.9% forested.

See also
List of rivers of Delaware

References 

Rivers of Delaware
Rivers of New Castle County, Delaware
Tributaries of the Smyrna River